Helvetinjärvi National Park (literally "Hell's Lake national park") is a national park in the Pirkanmaa region in Finland. The park was founded in 1982 and is managed by the Metsähallitus.

The park represents the wild forests of the Tavastia region. The area includes deep gorges and rugged scenery formed by faults running through the bedrock. The most impressive attraction is the cleft Helvetinkolu at the south-eastern end of Lake Helvetinjärvi.

See also
 List of national parks of Finland
 Protected areas of Finland

References

External links

 Helvetinjärvi National Park

Protected areas established in 1982
Geography of Pirkanmaa
Tourist attractions in Pirkanmaa
1982 establishments in Finland
National parks of Finland